Kalle Katajisto (born 24 April 1991) is a former motorcycle speedway rider from Finland.

Career
Katajisto was a member of the Finnish national team.  He rode in the British leagues when he signed for Edinburgh Monarchs in 2007. He stayed with the Scottish club for four seasons leaving after the 2014 season. However, he was to return to Britain in 2013 and 2014 riding for the Plymouth Devils.

In 2009, he won the bronze medal at the Finnish Individual Speedway Championship.

Results

World Championships 

 Team World Championships (Speedway World Team Cup and Speedway World Cup)
 2009 - 3rd place in the Qualifying Round Two
 Individual U-21 World Championship
 2008 - 12th place in the Qualifying Round Four
 2009 - 12th place in the Qualifying Round Five
 Team U-21 World Championship (Under-21 World Cup)
 2009 - 4th place in the Qualifying Round Two
 2010 - 4th place in the Qualifying Round One

European Championships 

 Individual U-19 European Championship
 2008 - 15th place in the Semi-Final 2
 2009 -  Tarnów - 12th place (5 pts)
 Team U-19 European Championship
 2009 - 2nd place in the Semi-Final

Domestic competitions 

 Individual Finnish Junior Championship
 2008 - Runner-up
 British Premier League
 2007 - 13th place for Edinburgh Monarchs

See also 
 Finland national speedway team (U-21, U-19)

References 

Finnish speedway riders
1991 births
Living people
Edinburgh Monarchs riders
Plymouth Devils riders